European records in the sport of athletics are ratified by the European Athletic Association. Records are kept for all events contested at the Olympic Games and some others.  Unofficial records for some other events are kept by track and field statisticians. Records are kept for events in track and field, road running, and racewalking.

Key to tables
Key:

+ = en route to longer distance

h = hand timing

A = affected by altitude

Wo = women only race

# = not recognised by European Athletics or/and World Athletics

X = unratified due to no doping control

OT = oversized track (> 200m in circumference)

a = aided road course according to World Athletics rule 31.21.3 (separation between start and finish
points more than 50% of race distance or the decrease in elevation greater than one in a thousand)

est = estimate

WB = world best

Outdoor

Men

Women

Mixed

Indoor

Men

Women

European best (outdoor) for non-standard events

Men

Women

European best (indoor) for non-standard events

Men

Women

See also

Notes

References
General
European Records 3 March 2023 updated
Specific

External links
EAA web site
World Athletics: European Records

 European
athletics
Records